Jonathan Dehe Sakovich (born June 26, 1970) is a former competition swimmer from Saipan who has represented Guam and the United States at international events.  At the 1988 Olympics he represented Guam, where he set the Guam records in the 400-meter and 1,500-meter freestyle and 400-meter individual medley, all three of which still stand as of May 2009.

Sakovich accepted an athletic scholarship to attend the University of Florida in Gainesville, Florida, where he swam for coach Randy Reese and coach Skip Foster's Florida Gators swimming and diving teams in National Collegiate Athletic Association (NCAA) competition from 1989 to 1992.  During his NCAA career, he received seven All-American honors.  Sakovich graduated from the University of Florida with a bachelor's degree in health and human performance in 1997.

Later in his swimming career, he represented the United States in such international competitions as the 1995 Pan American Games.

He was the head coach and aquatics director at the Bolles School in Jacksonville, Florida from 2015 until 2018. Sakovich received his master's degree in education, sport coaching, and pedagogy from Ohio University in 2019. LSU Tigers head coach Rick Bishop hired Sakovich as an associate head coach in 2021.

See also 

 List of University of Florida alumni
 List of University of Florida Olympians

References

External links
 

1970 births
Living people
American male freestyle swimmers
Florida Gators men's swimmers
Olympic swimmers of Guam
Swimmers at the 1988 Summer Olympics
Swimmers at the 1995 Pan American Games
People from Saipan
Pan American Games bronze medalists for the United States
Pan American Games medalists in swimming
Medalists at the 1995 Pan American Games